Heath Flora (born July 19, 1983) is an American politician in the California State Assembly.  He represents the northern San Joaquin Valley, including the city of Modesto.

Early life 
On July 19, 1983, Flora was born in Stanislaus County, California.

Career 
Flora served for over 15 years as a volunteer fire fighter. From 2005 to 2007, Flora was a firefighter with the California Department Forestry and Fire Protection. Flora is a businessman and owner of Golden Valley Equipment.

In, 2016, Flora's political career began when he ran for the California State Assembly to succeed fellow Republican Kristen Olsen, who ran successfully for the Stanislaus County Board of Supervisors.  In a surprise, he won the election and became a Republican member of California State Assembly for District 12, encompassing part of the San Joaquin Valley. Flora defeated Ken Vogel, a former San Joaquin County Supervisor, with 52.2% of the votes.

On November 6, 2018, as an incumbent, Flora won the election and continued serving District 12. Flora defeated Robert D. Chase with 60% of the votes.

In Flora's first term as a member of the Assembly, Flora authored seven bills that were ultimately signed into law, including bills to develop a firefighter pre-apprenticeship program and to reduce the impact of property taxes on new construction.

In 2020, Flora was reelected with 67% over Lathrop City Councilman Paul Akinjo.

In November 2020, amidst the COVID-19 pandemic, Heath Flora travelled to Hawaii to attend a conference with 120 other people.

Electoral history

2016 California State Assembly

2018 California State Assembly
See 2018 California State Assembly election

2020 California State Assembly
See 2020 California State Assembly election

Personal life 
Flora has two children. In 2015, Flora and his family moved from Modesto to Ripon, California, where he still lives. Flora’s wife, Melodie, filed for divorce in April 2022 in San Joaquin County Superior Court.

In July 2022, a woman named Emily Hughes claimed that Flora had multiple extra-marital affairs, one of which was with her. Hughes' affair with Flora took place while Hughes worked as a lobbyist for the California Medical Association and Flora was serving on the Assembly Health Committee which deals with issues of interest to the California Medical Association. In August 2022, Flora promised to issue a formal statement about the affair, but has yet to issue a statement as of a week after the promise.

References

External links 
 
 Campaign website
 Heath Flora at ballotpedia.org
 Heath Flora at lwv.org

Republican Party members of the California State Assembly
People from San Joaquin County, California
Living people
21st-century American politicians
1983 births